Sarmiento may refer to:

Places

Argentina
Sarmiento Department, San Juan, a subdivision of the San Juan Province
Sarmiento Department, Santiago del Estero, a subdivision of the Santiago del Estero Province
Sarmiento Department, Chubut, a subdivision of the Chubut Province
Sarmiento, Chubut, a city in Chubut Province

Chile
Cordillera Sarmiento, a mountain range in Chilean Patagonia
Monte Sarmiento, a mountain in Tierra del Fuego
Sarmiento Channel, a channel in the Chilean Archipelago
Sarmiento Lake, a lake in the Torres del Paine National Park, southern Chile

Sports
Club Atlético Sarmiento, a football club in Junín, Argentina
Sarmiento de Resistencia, a football club in Resistencia, Argentina

Other uses
 Sarmiento (surname)
 ARA Presidente Sarmiento, a former naval training ship from Argentina
 Ferrocarril Domingo Faustino Sarmiento, a railway line in Argentina